Swedish Italians are Swedish citizens or residents of Italian ethnic, cultural and linguistic heritage or identity.
There are approximately 8,126 people born in Italy living in Sweden today, as well as 10,961 people born in Sweden with at least one parent born in Italy.

Notable Swedish Italians 

Amelia Adamo, editor-in-chief
Alesso, DJ and producer
Anna Maria Corazza Bildt, MEP
Marcus Birro, poet, author and columnist
Peter Birro, poet, author and columnist
Lydia Capolicchio, journalist and hostess
Sandro Cavazza, singer and songwriter 
Johan De Farfalla, musician
Staffan de Mistura, UN and Arab League envoy to Syria
Thomas Di Leva, singer-songwriter
Jonnie Fedel, former football player
Helena Frith Powell, columnist and author. (Italian mother)
Claudia Galli, actress
Erik Gandini, film director
John Guidetti, football player
Bianca Ingrosso, blogger, social influencer, entrepreneur, and singer
Benjamin Ingrosso, singer and songwriter
Oliver Ingrosso, DJ, music producer and actor
Sebastian Ingrosso, DJ and producer
Pauline Kamusewu, singer
Marzia Kjellberg, Italian YouTuber who moved to Sweden multiple times before moving to UK.
Yvonne Lombard, actress
Veronica Maggio, singer
Angelique Magito, opera singer in the 19th century
Messiah Marcolin, heavy metal musician
Michael Nyqvist, actor
Hilda Petrini, watchmaker in the 19th century
Andreas Ravelli, former footballer
Thomas Ravelli, former footballer
Paolo Roberto, actor and former boxer
Mauro Scocco, singer
Marie Taglioni, ballet dancer in the 19th century
Roberto Vacchi, former cyclist
Andreas Vinciguerra, former tennis player
Niclas Wahlgren, actor
Hans Wahlgren, actor
Linus Wahlgren, actor
Pernilla Wahlgren, singer and actress
Alexandra Zazzi, chef
Oscar Zia, singer

See also 
 Italy–Sweden relations
 Italian diaspora

References

Italian
Italian
 
Sweden
Sweden